Alberto Guillermo Quintano Ralph (born 26 April 1946), commonly known as El Mariscal, is a Chilean former professional footballer. He played as a defender for Universidad de Chile in Chile's Primera División.

Career

Player
He emerged from the University of Chile in the 1960s. These years were historic for the "U" and were the period known as Ballet Azul. For a decade and a half he was a key figure in La Red.

At the end of that decade he migrated to Mexican football, where he became the star in the central defense of Cruz Azul, pairing with Javier "Kaliman" Guzman. He stayed there for six years.

He found a partner in Elias Figueroa, with whom he formed a defensive partnership, described as a true "wall" in the World Alemania '74.

He participated in the 1969 playoffs for the World Cup in Mexico '70 and in the 1977 playoffs for the World Cup in Argentina 1978. On both occasions Chile was not ranked.

Quintano ended his career as an active player playing for Club Deportivo Magallanes.

Manager
Quintano took over the youth categories in the table on U. Club Cruz Azul offered him the post as technical director until 1986, delivering good accounts but without the desired title.

He returned to Chile where he directed Everton, Deportes La Serena and University of Chile, where he first took over the youth divisions and then the first team. Between 1992 and 1993 he became Chief of Technical Divisions under the University of Chile, and then Director-General of all classes indoors.

From 1996 to 1998, he participated as Technical Manager at the National Association of Professional Football. (ANFP). In this capacity, he worked with Nelson Acosta, participating in the South American playoffs for the France 98 World Cup.

In 2000 became Professor of Football Instruction of the National Institute of Football, and in 2001 he became Director of the Career Coach of Football.

In June 2009 Quintano replaced Eduardo de la Torre and became the new Sporting Director For Mexican Club Cruz Azul.

References

External links
 
 

1946 births
Living people
Footballers from Santiago
Chilean footballers
Chile international footballers
Universidad de Chile footballers
Cruz Azul footballers
Club Deportivo Universidad Católica footballers
Deportes Magallanes footballers
Magallanes footballers
Chilean Primera División players
Liga MX players
1974 FIFA World Cup players
1979 Copa América players
Chilean expatriate footballers
Expatriate footballers in Mexico
Association football defenders
Chilean football managers
Cruz Azul managers
Everton de Viña del Mar managers
Universidad de Chile managers
Deportes La Serena managers
Liga MX managers
Chilean Primera División managers
Chilean expatriate football managers
Expatriate football managers in Mexico
Chilean expatriate sportspeople in Mexico